Kuala Lumpur City Centre (KLCC) is a multipurpose development area in Kuala Lumpur, Malaysia. KLCC refers to the area within and surrounding the KLCC Park but the term has also been widely used by buildings nearby to the vicinity.

Designed to be a city within a city, the 100-acre site hosts the tallest twin buildings in the world, the fourth tallest hotel in the world, a shopping mall, office buildings and several hotels. A public park and a mosque have also been built in the area and are open to everyone. Areas within KLCC is cooled via district cooling located on the property. The whole precinct was developed by KLCC Property Holdings Berhad (KLCCP) of the KLCC Group of Companies, a property investment arm of Petronas.

History 

The site of the Kuala Lumpur City Centre was historically part of an affluent suburban residential area north of the old Kuala Lumpur town, linked to the town via Ampang Road and populated by bungalows and mansions dating as far back as the colonial early-20th century. The centrepiece of the area was the original site of the Selangor Turf Club, with many houses constructed around the site to capitalise on views of the racing course. As large scale development moved northwards from old Kuala Lumpur town after the 1950s, development of the area gradually shifted from low-density residential homes to high-density commercial complexes and offices, raising the appeal of developing the suburb into a new commercial centre for Kuala Lumpur. In 1988, the Selangor Turf Club site and adjoining residential parcels were sold to be cleared away for the KLCC project; the Turf Club was subsequently relocated to Serdang. In the subsequent years after the relocation of the Turf Club, more surrounding residential plots were acquired for further development of KLCC.

Geographical definition 
The KLCC development is (unofficially) defined as the area bounded by Jalan Ampang in the north, Jalan P Ramlee in the west, Jalan Pinang and Jalan Kia Peng in the south, and Jalan Stonor in the east.

For land administration purposes, the KLCC precinct is listed as the 58th section, Bandar Kuala Lumpur.

Clockwise from north, KLCC is surrounded by Kampung Baru, Ampang Hilir, Tun Razak Exchange, Bukit Bintang and Bukit Nanas.

KLCC, forming part of Kuala Lumpur's central business district, falls within Bukit Bintang parliamentary constituency.

Development zone
KLCC is an area with mixed developments in various stages of construction. The area is divided into several plots of land, each with a specific purpose. Zoning of the development is based on the KLCC Masterplan.

Offices 
The 88-storey towers were built using mostly reinforced concrete, with steel-and-glass facades to resemble Islamic motifs which were intended to reflect the official and majority religion of Malaysia. The cross section of the tower resembles Rub el Hizb, which further solidifies the Islamic motif in the tower design.

ExxonMobil Tower

ExxonMobil Tower was completed 1 January 1997 and it is the headquarters of the Malaysian subsidiary of ExxonMobil, one of the largest listed companies in the world.

The 126 m (413 ft), 30-storey tower is a rectangular shaped building, with a virtually column-free interior. For aesthetics, the north and south elevations are set-back at level 5, while the north elevation facing the public park is further set-back at levels 22 and 26

Menara Carigali

Officially Menara 3 Petronas, this tower is a 60-story tower which was completed in 2012. The tower is connected with the shopping mall Suria KL

The tower is also designed by César Pelli with construction started in 2006 and finished in 2012. The tower has a separate entrance facing the Mandarin Oriental hotel and also has a tunnel link towards Lot D1. Lot D1 will be the site of a future development by the owner, KLCC Properties.  Like the Petronas Twin Towers, the Building Services Engineer was Flack + Kurtz.

The cross section of the tower features two geometric shapes, a square and a rectangle. The rectangle shape in the building starts at the ground floor and extends up to the 40th floor. The triangle shape extends to the top of the tower. At the top of the tower, a crown completes the design. It is expected the crown will hold the tower's company logo.

Menara Maxis

Menara Maxis is the headquarters of Maxis Communications, one of Malaysia's largest telecommunication companies.

Suria KLCC 

Suria KLCC is currently the only and main commercial centre in the KLCC area. The shopping mall occupies space underneath the Petronas Twin Towers and shares its parking lot (Suria KLCC parking rate) with it. The six-story shopping mall was extended to Menara Carigali in 2011. There are plans to extend the mall to Lot K and also Lot D1 as well.

The mall is linked to the Kuala Lumpur Convention Centre via an underground pedestrian tunnel, which in turn is connected to the Bukit Bintang shopping district via an elevated pedestrian walkway.

The Building Services Engineer was Flack + Kurtz who is currently part of the WSP | Parsons Brinkerhoff Company.

Hotels 

There are currently four hotels in the KLCC precinct:

 Mandarin Oriental is the main hotel which sits between Suria KLCC and Kuala Lumpur Convention Centre.
 Traders Hotel, which is owned by Petronas and run by Shangri-La Hotels, connects directly with the convention centre. This hotel has 571 rooms.
 The Four Seasons Place Kuala Lumpur, managed by Four Seasons Hotel and Resort, is located within the KLCC vicinity.
 Grand Hyatt Kuala Lumpur, facing Jalan Pinang, just next to the convention centre.

Kuala Lumpur Convention Centre 

The KLCC area has a  convention centre known as the Kuala Lumpur Convention Centre (Kuala Lumpur Convention Centre parking rate). The convention centre is directly connected with the Traders Hotel. The Impiana Hotel, which is owned and operated by KLCC Properties, developer of the KLCC area, is connected via a walk bridge. In the master plan, there will be several more buildings to be built near or on the convention centre area.

The Binjai On The Park
The Binjai On The Park is the only residential area within the development. The residential space is two 42-story buildings having an unobstructed view of the Petronas Twin Towers. It is designed by Allen Jack + Cottier (known famously as AJ+C), the Australian-based architect with regional presence in Malaysia, Vietnam and China. The residential towers is the most expensive in Malaysia with a 19,500 square feet penthouse has been sold for a record RM50 million.

Public area 

At the centre of the property lies KLCC Park. The park is one of the last designs of notable Brazilian park designer Roberto Burle Marx. The park holds a jogging track, a public swimming pool, several children's playground and a man-made lake complete with water fountains.

The area also has a mosque known as As Syakirin Mosque which has the capacity to hold 12,000 people. Naturally, many religious activities such as Friday prayers are conducted here.

Access

Public transport
KLCC is served by a light rapid transit (LRT) line at  KLCC station, served by the  Kelana Jaya Line. The underground station is located in the basement of Avenue K, a shopping complex opposite Suria KLCC across Jalan Ampang. The station is connected to Suria KLCC via an underground pedestrian walkway. It is also a bus hub for the RapidKL bus network, the largest public transport operator in Kuala Lumpur.

The district will also be served by the  Persiaran KLCC station, formerly known as KLCC East station, on the  MRT Putrajaya Line. The second phase of the line is expected to be completed in 2023 where this underground station is included. It will be directly connected to the KLCC Retail Podium and the Tower M in the future.

A dedicated taxi stand, which utilises the coupon system, is available at the shopping mall entrance. Patrons who do not wish to use the system have the option to walk up to another taxi stand which is situated on the main road.

Road network
Although the area is bordered by 5 main roads, main road access is through Jalan Ampang, Jalan Sultan Ismail and the Ampang–Kuala Lumpur Elevated Highway (AKLEH). The AKLEH access is quite unique in the sense that the highway has direct tunnel access to the area's extensive underground parking lot.

KLCC is also connected to Jalan Ampang via an underground tunnel.

Other access
The developer (Petronas) has spent RM100 million as part of its social contribution programme to build an elevated, air-conditioned walkway from the Kuala Lumpur Convention Centre to Bukit Bintang shopping district. From there, pedestrians can access the  Bukit Bintang and  Raja Chulan Monorail stations on the  KL Monorail line, and the  Bukit Bintang MRT station on the  Sungai Buloh-Kajang Line.

Utility
District cooling for the entire area is provided by KLCC Cooling, which is situated in Lot 40. The cooling was done via gas-powered turbine generator. This district cooling concept is the first implementation in Malaysia.

The engineer for the District Cooling Center was Flack + Kurtz (currently part of the WSP | Parsons Brinkerhoff Company).  The plant was renovated and upgraded and activated in 2015.  The current capacity is approximately 70,000 tons and has 180,000 ton hours of ice storage.

See also
 KL Sentral - Malaysia's main railway station with mixed development, in Brickfields
 Tun Razak Exchange - new financial centre between Bukit Bintang and Maluri
 KL Metropolis - major centre for international trade and exhibitions in Segambut
 Bangsar South City - an integrated property development built on the former Kampung Kerinchi in Lembah Pantai
 Bukit Bintang City Centre - integrated development on the site of the former Pudu Jail, now containing Southeast Asia's first LaLaport mall from Japan.
 Bandar Malaysia - a mothballed transit oriented development to be built on the former Sungai Besi Air Base
 Merdeka 118 - 118-story skyscraper near Petaling Street and Merdeka Stadium, including 118 Mall
 Mid Valley City - mixed development in Lembah Pantai which features 2 shopping malls
 Putrajaya - fully planned city in southern Selangor. Currently the administrative capital of Malaysia

References

External links
 

Geography of Kuala Lumpur